Basketball at the 2011 Island Games was held from 26 June–1 July 2011 at the Medina Leisure Centre for men and at the Cowes High School for the women's tournament.

Events

Medal table

Medal summary

References
Basketball at the 2011 Island Games

 
2011 in basketball
Basketball at the Island Games
Basketball
2010–11 in British basketball
International basketball competitions hosted by the United Kingdom